The Russian Ship of the line "Asow" and a Frigate at Anchor in the roads of Elsinore is a painting by the Danish painter, C. W. Eckersberg. It was painted in 1828.

The work is not an accurate rendition of the scene but a construction, using more than one event as the basis for the painting. For instance, Eckersberg moved the scene from Copenhagen where he had inspected such ships to Elsinore as is evident in the picture as Kronborg is seen in the background.

Eckersberg was very meticulous in preparing the painting, however. He studied these ship types beforehand, borrowing technical drawings from the naval dockyard. The process is documented in Eckersberg's diary.

References

Further reading
 Kasper Monrad: "Udsigt gennem tre buer – Dansk-tyske kunstnermøder i Danmark, Tyskland og Italien", in William Gelius and Stig Miss (eds.): Under samme himmel – Land og by i dansk og tysk kunst 1800-1850, Thorvaldsens Museum, Copenhagen 2000

1828 paintings
Paintings by Christoffer Wilhelm Eckersberg
Paintings in the collection of the National Gallery of Denmark
19th-century paintings in Denmark
Maritime paintings